Douglas Nixon (10 September 1898 – 3 October 1980) was a New Zealand cricketer. He played in six first-class matches for Canterbury from 1926 to 1928.

See also
 List of Canterbury representative cricketers

References

External links
 

1898 births
1980 deaths
New Zealand cricketers
Canterbury cricketers
People from Fairlie, New Zealand
Cricketers from Canterbury, New Zealand